CipherGraph Networks is a computer networking software company specializing in cloud security based in Pleasanton, California.

History
CipherGraph was founded in 2011 by Jitender Sharan. The company was accelerated by Microsoft Startup Accelerator  graduating in January 2013. CipherGraph won several awards like Microsoft BizSpark Startup Challenge, Nasscom Emerge 50 2012 among others. CipherGraph was added to the Amazon Web Services Partner Network in 2012.

CipherGraph was funded by Chamath Palihapitiya in 2012 through his investment fund Social+Capital Partnership, who joined their board.

Overview
CipherGraph Networks offers businesses security for data and applications hosted on public and private clouds. Their flagship offering is the CipherGraph Cloud Access Gateway.

CipherGraph Cloud Access Gateway
CipherGraph Cloud Access Gateway is a virtual appliance offering secure remote access for corporate employees with claimed connectivity from any location and device. CipherGraph Networks promotes its use to create a secure perimeter for cloud servers. It aims to be a replacement for VPN hardware in the cloud targeting businesses that are migrating to the cloud from their existing datacenter.

The virtual appliance is available for a number of cloud solutions such as AWS, OpenStack, Microsoft Azure as well as for various Virtualization Platforms. It is available in both free and paid versions through Amazon Web Services Marketplace. The paid versions are priced on an hourly basis with customers paying for actual usage as with other SaaS solutions. CipherGraph Networks claims compatibility with other cloud and virtualization platforms.

Features mentioned include features for the cloud along with enterprise grade Role-based access control, native Multifactor authentication and in-browser HTML5 apps for Remote Desktop Protocol and Secure Shell (SSH). The vendor mentions special focus on Regulatory compliance including support for the PCI DSS standard.

References

Companies established in 2011
Software companies based in California
Defunct software companies of the United States